Carlos Marcelino Zaragoza (born January 6, 1973 in Argentina) is a former Argentine footballer who played for clubs of Argentina and Chile.

Teams
  San Miguel 1991–1992
  Santiago Wanderers 1993–1995
  Deportivo Español 1996–1997
  San Miguel 1997–1999
  Banfield 1999–2000
  San Miguel 2000–2002
  Tigre 2002–2004
  Juventud Unida Universitario 2004–2005
  Comunicaciones 2005–2007

Teams
  Santiago Wanderers 1995 (Chilean Primera B Championship)

References
 
 

1973 births
Living people
Argentine expatriate footballers
Argentine footballers
Association football defenders
Club Atlético Banfield footballers
Club Atlético Tigre footballers
Deportivo Español footballers
Expatriate footballers in Chile
Primera B de Chile players
Santiago Wanderers footballers